Galactic Assault: Prisoner of Power is a turn-based strategy video game developed by Paradox Interactive and published by Wargaming.net.

Gameplay

Development
Galactic Assault: Prisoner of Power was developed by Paradox Interactive and published by Wargaming.net. The game is based on Prisoner of Power by Arkady and Boris Strugatsky. The game was originally titled Inhabited Island: Battlefield and was shown at E3 2006.

Reception

Galactic Assault: Prisoner of Power received generally average reviews from video game critics.

References

2007 video games
Paradox Interactive games
Science fiction video games
Turn-based strategy video games
Video games developed in Sweden
Windows games
Windows-only games